Crypsotidia longicosta is a moth of the family Erebidae. It is found in Angola, Malawi, Namibia and Tanzania.

References

Moths described in 2004
Crypsotidia